Anthropic is an American artificial intelligence (AI) startup and public-benefit corporation, founded by former members of OpenAI. Anthropic specializes in developing general AI systems and language models, with a company ethos of responsible AI usage. Since late 2022, Google has invested nearly $400 million in the company, with Anthropic announcing a formal partnership with Google Cloud.

History 
Anthropic was founded in 2021 by former senior members of OpenAI, principally siblings Daniela Amodei and Dario Amodei, the latter whom served as OpenAI's Vice President of Research. The Amodei siblings were among others who left OpenAI due to directional differences, specifically regarding OpenAI's ventures with Microsoft in 2019.
In February, 2023, Anthropic was sued by Texas-based Anthrop LLC for use of their registered trademark "Anthropic A.I."

Projects

Claude 
Consisting of former researchers involved in OpenAI's ChatGPT, Anthropic began development on its own AI chatbot, named Claude. Similar to ChatGPT, Claude uses a messaging interface where users can submit questions or requests and receive highly-detailed and relevant responses.

Initially available in closed beta through a Slack integration, Claude is now accessible to users via the Poe app by Quora along with two other chatbots. The app is currently available for iOS and will soon be available for Android.

Interpretability research 
Anthropic also publishes research on the interpretability of machine learning systems, focusing on the transformer architecture.

References

2021 establishments in California